This is a list of the ascetics belonging to the Digambara sect of Jainism. These ascetics are known for their contributions to Jain philosophy and Jainism in general. According to Digambar jain history there are about three less than ten million jain ascetics till this date that have achieved Moksha.

Before the Common Era 
 Indrabhuti Gautama
 Sudharmaswami
 Jambu Swami
 Bhadrabahu, c. 4th century BCE. Last acharya of undivided Jain sangha.
 Kundakunda- 1st century BCE

Common Era - Acharya 
 Acharya Samantabhadra
 Akalanka, c. 8th century CE., known for his works on Jain logic.
 Aryanandi, 20th century
 Bhutabali
 Pushpadanta (Jain monk)
 Aparajita (Jain monk)
 Ilango Adigal
 Jinaratna
 Jinasena, Digambara, preceptor of the Rashtrakuta rulers, 800–880 CE.
 Kumudendu
 Manatunga composer of Bhaktamara Stotra
 Nemichandra
 Prabhācandra
 Pujyapada
 Siddhasena Divakara, 5th century CE
 Umaswati
 Virasena, 790–825 CE

20th century
 Shantisagar, Digambara, 1872–1955
 Jinendra Varni
 Acharya Gyansagar
 Gyansagar
 Ganeshprasad Varni, 1874–1961 CE. Founder of many Jain Institutions.
 Acharya Vidyananda
 Aryika Shri Gyanmati Mataji 
 Acharya Vidyasagar, Born 1946
 Acharya Vardhmansagar, Born 1950
GanaAcharya Shree 108 Viragsagar Ji Maharaj , Born 1963 
 Acharya Vishudhha Sagar Ji Maharaj, Born 1971

Common Era - Muni 
Tarunsagar

Notes

References 

Jainism-related lists